The canton of Saintonge Estuaire is an administrative division of the Charente-Maritime department, western France. It was created at the French canton reorganisation which came into effect in March 2015. Its seat is in Meschers-sur-Gironde.

It consists of the following communes:

Arces
Barzan
Boutenac-Touvent
Brie-sous-Mortagne
Chenac-Saint-Seurin-d'Uzet
Cozes
Cravans
Épargnes
Floirac
Gémozac
Grézac
Jazennes
Meschers-sur-Gironde
Meursac
Montpellier-de-Médillan
Mortagne-sur-Gironde
Saint-André-de-Lidon
Saint-Simon-de-Pellouaille
Talmont-sur-Gironde
Tanzac
Thaims
Villars-en-Pons
Virollet

References

Cantons of Charente-Maritime